Shilluk may refer to:
the Shilluk Kingdom
the Shilluk people
the Shilluk language